Károly Schaffer (September 7, 1864, Vienna – October 16, 1939, Budapest) was a Hungarian anatomist and neurologist. He was born in Vienna. The axon projection from CA3 to CA1 neurons in hippocampus, Schaffer collateral, is named after him.

He was involved in the early studies of Tay–Sachs disease.

Authored Books 
 Über das morphologische Wesen und die Histopathologie der hereditär-systematischen Nervenkrankheiten (Berlin, 1926)
 Az elmebetegségek és kapcsolatos idegbetegségek kórtana (Pathology of mental diseases and their related nervous disorders. Budapest, 1927)
 Anatomische Wesenbestimmung der hereditär-organischen Nerven-Geisteskrankheiten (With Dezsö Miskolczy. Szeged, 1936)
 Histopathologie des Neurons (Budapest-Leipzig, 1938)

References

External links 
 https://web.archive.org/web/20070930155841/http://www.kereso.hu/yrk/Ryrgenwm/13218 (in Hungarian)

Hungarian anatomists
Austrian anatomists
Hungarian histologists
Austrian histologists
Hungarian neurologists
Austrian neurologists
Hungarian expatriates in Austria
Scientists from Vienna
1864 births
1939 deaths